Per una manciata d'oro is a 1965 Italian adventure film.

Cast
 Mario Novelli (credited as Anthony Freeman) as Tarzak 
 Brad Euston as Nelson 
 Luigi Batzella (credited as Paolo Solvay) as Fred

External links
 
 Per una manciata d'oro at Variety Distribution

1965 films
Italian adventure films
1960s Italian-language films
1960s Italian films